is a passenger railway station located in the city of Ise,  Mie Prefecture, Japan, operated by the private railway operator Kintetsu Railway.

Lines
Akeno Station is served by the Yamada Line, and is located 22.4 rail kilometers from the starting point of the line at Ujiyamada Station.

Station layout
The station consists of two opposed side platforms , connected by an underpass crossing. The station is unattended.

Platforms

Adjacent stations

History
Akeno Station opened on March 27, 1930, as a station on the Sangu Kyuko Electric Railway. On March 15, 1941, the line merged with Osaka Electric Railway to become a station on Kansai Kyuko Railway's Yamada Line. This line, in turn, was merged with the Nankai Electric Railway on June 1, 1944, to form Kintetsu. A new station building was completed in March 1992.

Passenger statistics
In fiscal 2019, the station was used by an average of 1149 passengers daily (boarding passengers only).

Surrounding area
Akeno High School
Japan Ground Self-Defense Force (JGSDF) Aviation School

See also
List of railway stations in Japan

References

External links

Kintetsu: Akeno Station

Railway stations in Japan opened in 1930
Railway stations in Mie Prefecture
Stations of Kintetsu Railway
Ise, Mie